The 2015–16 UEFA Youth League was the third season of the UEFA Youth League, a European youth club football competition organised by UEFA.

After a two-year trial period, the UEFA Youth League became a permanent UEFA competition starting from this season, with the tournament expanded from 32 to 64 teams.

Chelsea retained their title after defeating Paris Saint-Germain 2–1 in the final.

Format changes
The UEFA Executive Committee held on 18 September 2014 approved the following changes to the UEFA Youth League starting from the 2015–16 season:
The tournament is expanded from 32 to 64 teams. The 64 teams include the youth teams of the 32 clubs which participate in the UEFA Champions League group stage, which have been included since the first edition, as well as the youth domestic champions of the top 32 associations according to their UEFA country coefficients, which are included starting from this edition. Associations without a youth domestic champion as well as domestic champions already included in the UEFA Champions League path are replaced by the next association in the UEFA ranking.
The new format of the competition sees the two groups of teams compete in separate paths until the play-offs:
In the UEFA Champions League path, the 32 Champions League youth teams retain the group stage format and schedule which correspond to the Champions League group stage. The group winners advance to the round of 16, and the group runners-up advance to the play-offs.
In the Domestic Champions path, the 32 youth domestic champions play two rounds of two-legged ties, with the eight winners advancing to the play-offs.
In the play-offs, the youth domestic champions play a single match at home against the UEFA Champions League path group runners-up.
In the round of 16, the UEFA Champions League path group winners play a single match against the winners of the play-offs (home team determined by draw).
In the quarter-finals, semi-finals, and final, teams play each other over a single match (quarter-finals home team determined by draw, semi-finals and final played at neutral venues).
The under-19 age limit is retained, but clubs are able to include a maximum of three under-20 players in their overall list of 40 players for the competition, in order to alleviate the burden on players having school duties.

Teams
A total of 64 teams from 37 of the 54 UEFA member associations entered the tournament. They were split into two sections:
The youth teams of the 32 clubs which qualified for the 2015–16 UEFA Champions League group stage entered the UEFA Champions League Path.
The youth domestic champions of the top 32 associations according to their 2014 UEFA country coefficients entered the Domestic Champions Path. Associations without a youth domestic champion as well as domestic champions already included in the UEFA Champions League path were replaced by the next association in the UEFA ranking.

Notes

Squads
Players must be born on or after 1 January 1997, with a maximum of three players per team born between 1 January 1996 and 31 December 1996 allowed.

Round and draw dates
The schedule of the competition was as follows (all draws were held at the UEFA headquarters in Nyon, Switzerland, unless stated otherwise).

Notes
For the UEFA Champions League Path group stage, in principle the teams play their matches on Tuesdays and Wednesdays, the same day as the corresponding senior teams in the UEFA Champions League; however, matches may also be played on other dates, including Mondays and Thursdays.
For the Domestic Champions Path first and second rounds, in principle matches are played on Wednesdays; however, matches may also be played on other dates, including Mondays, Tuesdays and Thursdays.
For the play-offs, round of 16 and quarter-finals, in principle matches are played on Tuesdays and Wednesdays; however, matches may also be played on other dates, provided they are completed before the following dates:
Play-offs: 12 February 2016
Round of 16: 26 February 2016
Quarter-finals: 18 March 2016

UEFA Champions League Path

For the UEFA Champions League Path, the 32 teams were drawn into eight groups of four. There was no separate draw held, with the group compositions identical to the draw for the 2015–16 UEFA Champions League group stage, which was held in Monaco on 27 August 2015.

In each group, teams played against each other home-and-away in a round-robin format. The eight group winners advanced to the round of 16, while the eight runners-up advanced to the play-offs, where they were joined by the eight second round winners from the Domestic Champions Path. The matchdays were 15–16 September, 29–30 September, 20–21 October, 3–4 November, 24–25 November, and 8–9 December 2015.

Group A

Group B

Group C

Group D

Group E

Group F

Group G

Group H

Domestic Champions Path

For the Domestic Champions Path, the 32 teams were drawn into two rounds of two-legged home-and-away ties. The draw was held on 1 September 2015. There were no seedings, but the 32 teams were split into four groups defined by sporting and geographical criteria prior to the draw.
In the first round, teams in the same group were drawn against each other.
In the second round, the winners from Group 1 were drawn against the winners from Group 2, and the winners from Group 3 were drawn against the winners from Group 4, with the order of legs decided by draw.

The eight second round winners advanced to the play-offs, where they were joined by the eight group runners-up from the UEFA Champions League Path.

If the aggregate scores were level after full-time of the second leg, the away goals rule was used to decide the winner. If still tied, the match was decided by a penalty shoot-out (no extra time was played).

First round
The first legs were played on 29 and 30 September, and the second legs were played on 7, 14, 20 and 21 October 2015.

Second round
The first legs were played on 4, 5 November and 2 December, and the second legs were played on 24, 25 November and 6 December 2015.

Play-offs

For the play-offs, the 16 teams were drawn into eight ties played over one match. The draw was held on 14 December 2015. The eight second round winners from the Domestic Champions Path were drawn against the eight group runners-up from the UEFA Champions League Path, with the teams from the Domestic Champions Path hosting the match. Teams from the same association could not be drawn against each other.

The eight play-off winners advanced to the round of 16, where they were joined by the eight group winners from the UEFA Champions League Path. The play-offs were played on 9 and 10 February 2016.

If the scores were level after full-time, the match was decided by a penalty shoot-out (no extra time was played).

Knockout phase

For the knockout phase (round of 16 onwards), the 16 teams were drawn into a single-elimination tournament, with all ties played over one match. The draw was held on 15 February 2016. The mechanism of the draws for each round was as follows:
In the draw for the round of 16, the eight group winners from the UEFA Champions League Path were drawn against the eight play-off winners. Teams from the same UEFA Champions League Path group could not be drawn against each other, but teams from the same association could be drawn against each other. The draw also decided the home team for each round of 16 match.
In the draws for the quarter-finals onwards, there were no seedings, and teams from the same UEFA Champions League Path group or the same association could be drawn against each other. The draws also decided the home team for each quarter-final, and the "home" team for administrative purposes for each semi-final and final (which were played at a neutral venue).

If the scores were level after full-time, the match was decided by a penalty shoot-out (no extra time was played).

Bracket (round of 16 onwards)

Round of 16
The round of 16 matches were played on 23 and 24 February 2016.

Notes

Quarter-finals
The quarter-finals were played on 8, 9 and 15 March 2016.

Semi-finals
The semi-finals were played on 15 April 2016 at Colovray Stadium, Nyon.

Final
The final was played on 18 April 2016 at Colovray Stadium, Nyon.

Statistics

Top goalscorers

Top assists

References

External links

2015–16 UEFA Youth League

 
Youth
2015-16
Uefa Youth League
Uefa Youth League